was the tenth and last of the s built for the Imperial Japanese Navy in the mid-1930s under the Circle Two Supplementary Naval Expansion Program (Maru Ni Keikaku).

History
The Asashio-class destroyers were larger and more capable than the preceding , as Japanese naval architects were no longer constrained by the provisions of the London Naval Treaty. These light cruiser-sized vessels were designed to take advantage of Japan’s lead in torpedo technology, and to accompany the Japanese main striking force and in both day and night attacks against the United States Navy as it advanced across the Pacific Ocean, according to Japanese naval strategic projections. Despite being one of the most powerful classes of destroyers in the world at the time of their completion, none survived the Pacific War.

Arare, built at the Maizuru Naval Arsenal, was laid down on 5 March 1937, launched on 16 November 1937 and commissioned on 15 April 1939. On completion, she was assigned to the IJN 2nd Fleet as part of Desdiv 18, Desron 2 under command of Commander Tomoe Ogata.

Operational history
At the time of the attack on Pearl Harbor, Arare was based at Etorofu in the Kurile Islands, and sailed as part of the escort for Admiral Nagumo’s Carrier Strike Force, guarding the fleet tankers accompanying the strike force. She returned to Kure on 24 December.

Arare departed Staring-baai on 27 March to escort the carrier force in the Indian Ocean raid on 27 March  After the Japanese air strikes on Colombo and Trincomalee in Ceylon, she returned to Kure for repairs on 23 April.
Arare deployed from Saipan on 3 June as part of the escort for the troop convoy in the Battle of Midway.

On 28 June, she was assigned to escort  to Kiska in the Aleutian Islands on a supply mission. Commander Ogata was among the 42 survivors rescued by the destroyer . She was removed from the navy list on 31 July 1942.

Notes

References

External links
 CombinedFleet.com: Asashio-class destroyers
 CombinedFleet.com: Arare history
GlobalSecurity.org: Asashio class destroyers

Asashio-class destroyers
Ships built by Maizuru Naval Arsenal
World War II destroyers of Japan
Ships of the Aleutian Islands campaign
Ships sunk by American submarines
1937 ships
Maritime incidents in July 1942